Auchan is a French multinational retail group headquartered in Croix, France. It was founded in 1961 by Gérard Mulliez and is owned by the Mulliez family, who has 95% stake in the company.
With 354,851 employees, of which 261,000 have 5% stake in the company, it is the 35th largest employer in the world.

The name comes from the first Auchan shop in Roubaix in the district of Hauts-Champs, the pronunciation of which is identical to that of "Auchan".<ref>Cédric Citrain, "A Cap occitan, on fête les 50 ans d'Auchan", Midi Libre" (Bézier edition),19 January 2011, p3.</ref>

The holding company, Auchan Holding, includes Auchan Retail International, Ceetrus, which operates shopping centers and Oney, which offers financial services. It operates as Alcampo in Spain ("al campo" is the literal Spanish translation of the French "au champ"), Auchan in Portugal, Aшан (Ashan) in Russia and Ukraine, and through a joint-venture as RT-Mart in China (Auchan brand is also used) and Taiwan.

As of 2022, Auchan is one of the world's largest retailers with a direct presence in France, Spain, Portugal, Luxembourg, Poland, Romania, Hungary, Ukraine, Russia, Taiwan and Senegal.

Auchan is notable for being a rare example of a Western company continuing to operate in Russia after Moscow sent thousands of troops into Ukraine and actively supporting Russian military effort.

History
 1961–1969: The beginnings 
After meeting the founders of the Carrefour and Leclerc, on July 6, 1961, Gérard Mulliez opens the first Auchan store in a disused factory of the company Phildar, founded by his father, also named Gérard. Covering an area of 600 m2, this store was located in the district of Hauts-Champs, in Roubaix. Originally, the store was to be called "Ochan", but because of the Japanese sounding, changed the name to "Auchan".  The choice of the initial letter "A" was desired by the founders to appear in first place in directories. Gérard Mulliez relied on the advice of Édouard Leclerc to open his first supermarket. This store had to be closed in the 1980s because of strong competition with the one that had been built in Leers. The building was bought by the Intermarché. In 2003 it was demolished to make space for a more modern store.

In the summer of 1967, on 20 August, Auchan opens its first hypermarket in Roncq in an initially commercial area of 3500 m2. According to Gérard Mulliez, Roncq location served as a model for other hypermarkets in France in non-food enlargement. On March 27, 1969 was opened the Englos-les-Géants shopping center at Englos in the Lille metropolis. Englos les Giants was the first shopping mall with a hypermarket and a retail park in France.

 Mulliez family 
Auchan SA is controlled by the Mulliez family, one of the wealthiest in France and in Europe. The Mulliez family also owns Leroy Merlin, Decathlon and other retailers.

Auchan operations

China
Auchan opened its first store in Shanghai in 1999. It operates through Sun Art Retail Group, a public company listed in Hong Kong, in which Auchan holds 38,5% stake and Alibaba Group 26%.

Suzhou Jinji Lake store that is located in Suzhou Industrial Park had nine million visitors during that fiscal year with over four hundred million turnover and became one of the biggest Auchan hypermarkets in the world. Suzhou store expanded in 2008 and is the biggest Auchan Hypermarket in China, the second biggest in the world. Also, Auchan China led to open its online shopping website for the stores in Shanghai and Suzhou.

Auchan offers online shopping only in those two cities so far and is opening in Suzhou its first AuchanDrive store, based on its French model (click & go) in May 2012. The AuchanDrive service allows customers to purchase groceries online for home delivery, these locations being examples of online supermarkets in China.

Since 2017, a number of unmanned convenience stores, marketed as BingoBox, are being operated by Auchan in China.

In 2020, Auchan leaves China, after selling its shares to Alibaba.

Russia

Auchan (branded as Aшан) has been active on the Russian market since 2002 and had over 100 hypermarkets in the country by December 2016. It's the company's third largest market, after France and China. Revenues for the country reached $5 billion in 2014, ranking third behind the local retailers X5 Retail Group and Magnit. In 2016 it was ranked first in a list of the largest foreign-owned companies by the Russian edition of Forbes.

In November 2021, Russian “Auchan” signed with online-delivery service "Sbermarket" a deal of strategic partnership in e-commerce until 2028. First, from 2022, both partners will be focused on delivery from darkstores as well as delivery and loyalty programs for B2B clients. In January 2022, Russian Auchan switched on 73 stores (more than a half of its stores, including "Atak") to Sbermarket delivery.
One of few companies still operating in Russia after the country invaded and went to war against Ukraine. Despite EU and US sanctions Auchan have continued their operations in Russia, arguing they will continue to do so for "humanitarian reasons".

In 2023 joint investigation by The Insider, Bellingcat and Le Monde revealed that Auchan Russia is actively supporting Russian occupational forces in Ukraine by periodically supplying food, clothes, cigarettes and other items. Official Auchan communications claimed these items were supplied to Donbas as "humanitarian help" but as noted in the investigation, all collected items were targeted at "adult men" including items that are never supplied in regular humanitarian help, such as cigarettes, and were thus intended for Russian soldiers. Auchan Russia reportedly both organizes "mandatory voluntary" collections among its employees and provides batches of these items for free.

Auchan Holding
Auchan Holding is composed by Auchan Retail, Ceetrus and Oney. It also consists of: Ceetrus (former Immochan), the division which operates shopping centers and hypermarket galleries and Oney (former Bank Accord), the financial services group that offers consumer credits and Auchan and Leroy Merlin credit cards.

Slogan
The slogan of the company was La Vie, La Vraie, which translates into English as "Life, the real one".  The slogan was changed in 2007 to:  La vie Auchan, elle change la vie – "Auchan's lifestyle changes life (itself).

Withdrawn ventures

Auchan opened a number of stores in Mexico; the first of these opened in Mexico City in 1996 and eventually grew to five stores.The first store located in Tlatelolco, was sold to Comercial Mexicana in 1998. Faced with stiff competition from Wal-Mart, as well as local superstore chains Gigante and Comercial Mexicana, and French rival Carrefour (who also sold their stores and left the country in March 2005), Auchan decided to sell their stores to Comercial Mexicana and withdrew from Mexico in early 2003, the 3 stores located in Tlatelolco, Gran Sur and Arboledas, were sold to Soriana in 2016.

In 2002 Auchan sold its hypermarkets in Thailand to Groupe Casino.

In 2007 Auchan sold its Argentine stores to Wal-Mart and withdrew from the country.

Following a conflict with its Moroccan partner ONA, Auchan sold its 49% share in August 2007.

In January 2011 Auchan dropped out of the Dubai market after just two years.

The first Italian Auchan hypermarket was opened in Turin on 1989. In 2019 Auchan withdrew from Italy due to financial losses, by selling most of the activities of its Auchan Retail Italia to the Italian retailer Conad. 
Also withdrew from Vietnam due to losses and slow development.

United States
Auchan did business in the United States from 1988 to 2003 as Auchan Hypermarket under its subsidiary, Auchan USA, who was the successor of interest to Texfield Inc. By the time of its closing it was the only French hypermarket chain to still operate American stores, as other hypermarket chains, such as Carrefour and E.Leclerc (under the guise of Leedmark) gave up in the United States market around 
1993–1994.

The first American Auchan (pronounced by Houstonians as “o-shawn”) store opened in western Houston on October 14, 1988. The  hypermarket was located on a  plot of land on Beltway 8, north of U.S. Route 59/Interstate 69. The store was one of many hypermarkets to open in the U.S in the late 80's,
after Walmart debuted Hypermart USA in December 1987, and Carrefour's Philadelphia store debuted in March 1988. David Kaplan of the Houston Chronicle said "it was fairly unusual and became something of a tourist attraction" when it had first opened, as it was big enough to house many small businesses in front, such as a travel agency, a jewelry store, a bank, and a food court containing a Taco Bell, McDonald's, and Pizza Hut. It also featured a huge cheese selection, a huge beer and wine selection, featuring local breweries such as Celis White, and a bakery, and like most hypermarkets operating in the U.S. in the late 1980s, as well as Aldi, Auchan also made customers use quarters to use the shopping carts, and in order to appeal to Houstonians, it had a huge seafood selection, as well as rodeo wear.

Auchan also opened a store in the Chicago suburb of Bridgeview, Illinois, in 1989. It only sold food, and it was not as large as the Houston store. In 1991 the store closed. It was later bought by a local Chicago supermarket chain, Dominick's, and converted into an Omni Superstore by 1991.

Auchan's second Greater Houston location opened in southeast Houston in September 2000, in a former Target store, which Auchan heavily renovated (and partially built up on) prior to opening, the most obvious example being the entrances, designed to make it look huge, despite its past as a Target. Kaplan said, "Auchan had solid business its first years, but with only two stores in the country, the company lacked buying power and economy-of-scale advantages." In early January 2003 Auchan announced that both of its U.S. stores were making losses and were going to be closed; Auchan stated that it was instead going to concentrate its expansion in Asia and Europe, and on January 6, 2003, Auchan closed the two money-losing stores, ending all American operations after 15 years. Auchan USA sold its first Houston location to Ho Enterprises. Kaplan said that by 2003, "the Houston market is saturated with huge discounters and large grocery stores." In addition, many similar stores, including an H-E-B Food and Drug Store, the Hong Kong Supermarket, a Sam's Club, and a Wal-Mart had opened in proximity to the west Houston Auchan. In Europe, zoning laws would prevent such a high concentration of similar stores. Kaplan further added that "In Europe, shopping malls are not as prevalent as they are in America, and Auchan's everything-under-one-roof concept has greater appeal" in Europe rather than in the United States. The second former Auchan is now used by a local scaffolding company, and was used as a shelter for Hurricane Katrina victims in 2005 and Hurricane Ike victims in 2008 due to its large space.

Criticism
 Building collapse at Savar 

On 24 April 2013, the eight-story Rana Plaza'' commercial building collapsed in Savar, a sub-district near Dhaka, the capital of Bangladesh. At least 1,127 people died and over 2,438 were injured. The factory housed a number of separate garment factories employing around 5,000 people, several shops, and a bank  and manufactured apparel for brands including the Benetton Group, Joe Fresh, The Children's Place, Primark, Monsoon, and DressBarn.  Of the 29 brands identified as having sourced products from the Rana Plaza factories, only 9 attended meetings held in November 2013 to agree a proposal on compensation to the victims. Several companies refused to sign including Walmart, Carrefour, Mango, Auchan and Kik. The agreement was signed by Primark, Loblaw, Bonmarché and El Corte Ingles.

2022 Russian invasion of Ukraine 
Following the 2022 Russian invasion of Ukraine which began on February 24, many international, particularly Western companies pulled out of Russia. Auchan, with nearly 300 stores and 41,000 employees in Russia, has been criticized for not announcing any scaling down of its operations, unlike most of its Western competitors.

According to documents obtained by the NGO Bellingcat, the independent Russian media The Insider and Le Monde, the retail company, owned by the Mulliez family, eighth French fortune according to Challenges, is allegedly participating in the Russian war effort. 

On February 23, 2023, the National Agency for the Prevention of Corruption added the French chain Auchan Holding to the list of international sponsors of the war.  During the full-scale invasion, the company refused to leave the Russian market, and its Russian subsidiary Auchan supplied products to the Russian occupiers fighting in Ukraine. The corporation itself denied the branch's involvement in helping the Russians, and justified its decision to stay in Russia by helping the civilian population.

See also
 List of companies of France
 List of hypermarkets

References

External links

 Auchan Retail
 Auchan Holding
 Auchan USA (Archive)

Retail companies established in 1961
Retail companies of France
Hypermarkets of France
Supermarkets of Italy
Supermarkets of Poland
Supermarkets of Portugal
Supermarkets of Romania
Supermarkets of Russia
Supermarkets of San Marino
Supermarkets of Ukraine
Supermarkets of China
1961 establishments in France
Multinational companies headquartered in France
French brands